Sisawad Dalavong (born August 11, 1996), is a Laotian professional footballer currently playing as a left winger and striker for Lao Army FC and the Laos national football team.

Career statistics

International

References

External links
 
 

1996 births
Living people
Laotian footballers
Laos international footballers
Lao Army F.C. players
Association football forwards
People from Savannakhet province